Roshanak saberan born 19 October 1996 is a member of the national kickboxing team of the Islamic Republic of Iran.

Achievements

  World Championships in kickboxing weight 65 - in India 2016
  Kyokushin karate world in body contact style weight 65 - in India 2016
  Kyokushin kata international weight 70 - in Turkey 2017
  Kyokushin committee international weight 70 - in Turkey 2017
  International Kyokushin karate committee of weight 70 - in Tehran 2016
  International Kyokushin Karate Championships (kwf) of weight 70 - in Turkey 2017
 Setting the world record of consecutive boxing for 64 hours and 27 minutes in Iran 2020
  the World Full Contact Kickboxing Championships in Turkey 2022

References 

1996 births
Living people
Iranian female kickboxers